Cynthia Lee Goyette (born August 13, 1946), also known by her married name Cynthia McCulloch, is an American former competition swimmer, Olympic champion, and former world record-holder.  She represented the United States as an 18-year-old at the 1964 Summer Olympics in Tokyo.  She won a gold medal for swimming the breaststroke leg for the first-place U.S. team in the women's 4 × 100-metre medley relay.  The U.S. relay team set a new world record of 4:33.9 in the event final; Goyette's teammates included Cathy Ferguson (backstroke), Sharon Stouder (butterfly), and Kathy Ellis (freestyle).

See also
 List of Olympic medalists in swimming (women)
 World record progression 4 × 100 metres medley relay

References

External links
 

1946 births
Living people
American female breaststroke swimmers
World record setters in swimming
Olympic gold medalists for the United States in swimming
Pan American Games gold medalists for the United States
Swimmers from Detroit
Swimmers at the 1963 Pan American Games
Swimmers at the 1964 Summer Olympics
Swimmers at the 1967 Pan American Games
Medalists at the 1964 Summer Olympics
Pan American Games bronze medalists for the United States
Pan American Games medalists in swimming
Universiade medalists in swimming
Universiade gold medalists for the United States
Universiade silver medalists for the United States
Medalists at the 1967 Summer Universiade
Medalists at the 1963 Pan American Games
Medalists at the 1967 Pan American Games
21st-century American women